The Bjarkøy Fixed Link is a fixed link which connects the three islands of Bjarkøya, Sandsøya, and Grytøya in Harstad Municipality in Troms og Finnmark county, Norway. The fixed link was completed in late 2018. A subsea road tunnel connects the islands of Grytøya and Bjarkøya, and a bridge connects the islands of Grytøya and Sandsøya. The project also included  of new road on Grytøya to connect the existing roads to the new undersea tunnel. The Bjarkøy Tunnel is designated as part of Norwegian County Road 867, while the Sandsøya Bridge is part of Norwegian County Road 124.

History
The former municipality of Bjarkøy had a population of about 500 people. In a referendum in 2002, the residents voted to merge with the much larger neighboring Harstad Municipality if the fixed link was built, but since less than two-thirds of the vote approved it, it was not a binding vote. After further discussions, the municipalities were merged on 1 January 2013. The financing of the project is based on financing from tolls, saved subsidies to the ferry operations, the savings of  needed to build new ferry quays if the ferry service had continued, money saved through the municipal merger, and grants from Troms County Municipality.

Construction
Construction began in late 2014, and as of October 2015 the Bjarkøy tunnel bore reached  from Grytøya. In July 2017, asphalting of the road surface inside the tunnel commenced with the projected completion date revised to autumn 2018.

References

Subsea tunnels in Norway
Road tunnels in Troms og Finnmark
Harstad
Roads within the Arctic Circle